Founded in 1954 and chartered as a non-profit organization in 1956, the American College of Preventive Medicine (ACPM) is an American physicians' organization focused on practice, research, publication, and teaching of evidence-based preventive medicine. It publishes the American Journal of Preventive Medicine, which is their official journal.

Background

In 1954, ACPM was established to provide a supportive home for the increasing number of preventive medicine board-certified physicians. Two years later, it became chartered as a non-profit organization.

ACPM has more than 2,700 members who are working worldwide in science research, government and healthcare services. ACPM provides a vibrant platform for knowledge sharing among specialists in preventive medicine, and offers training programs for research, information, and opportunities for ongoing professional growth.

Preventive Medicine is a distinct medical specialty recognized by the American Board of Medical Specialties. A specialist in Preventive Medicine focuses on the health of individuals and defined populations in order to protect, promote and maintain health and well-being, and to prevent disease, disability and premature death. They may be a specialist in Aerospace Medicine, Occupational Medicine, or Public Health & General Preventive Medicine.

See also

 American Board of Preventive Medicine
 American Osteopathic Board of Preventive Medicine

References

External links
 

Medical associations based in the United States
Organizations established in 1954
Preventive medicine
Medical and health organizations based in Washington, D.C.